OSU Press may refer to:
Oregon State University Press 
Ohio State University Press